Gizmodo is a design, technology, science and science fiction website. It was originally launched as part of the Gawker Media network run by Nick Denton, and runs on the Kinja platform. Gizmodo also includes the subsite io9, which focuses on science fiction and futurism. Gizmodo is now part of G/O Media, owned by private equity firm Great Hill Partners.

History
The blog, launched in 2002, was originally edited by Peter Rojas, who was later recruited by Weblogs, Inc. to launch their similar technology blog, Engadget. By mid-2004, Gizmodo and Gawker together were bringing in revenue of approximately $6,500 per month.

Gizmodo then launched in other locations:

In 2005, VNU and Gawker Media formed an alliance to republish Gizmodo across Europe, with VNU translating the content into French, German, Dutch, Spanish, Italian and Portuguese, and adding local European-interest material.

In 2006, Gizmodo Japan was launched by Mediagene, with additional Japanese contents.

In 2007, Gizmodo Australia was launched in the US, by Allure Media under license from Gawker Media. This site incorporates additional Australian content, and is branded Gizmodo AU.

In November 2007, the Dutch magazine license was taken over by HUB Uitgevers.

In September 2008, Gizmodo Brazil was launched with Portuguese content.

In September 2011, Gizmodo UK was launched with Future, to cover British news. Gizmodo UK was later shut down in September 2020, with all web links redirecting to Gizmodo.com.

In February 2011, Gizmodo underwent a major redesign.

In 2013, Matt Novak moved his Paleofuture blog to Gizmodo from Smithsonian.

In 2015, the Gawker blog io9 was merged into Gizmodo. The staff of io9 continued with Gizmodo and continued to post articles on subjects covered by the website, including science fiction, fantasy, futurism, science, technology and astronomy.

Gizmodo was one of six websites that was purchased by Univision Communications in their acquisition of Gawker Media in August 2016. Univision in turn sold Gizmodo and an array of sister websites to private equity firm Great Hill Partners in 2019.

In Australia in 2018, after Nine Entertainment merged the business behind PEDESTRIAN.TV with that of Allure Media, forming the larger Pedestrian Group, the website and associated company changed its name to Pedestrian, and also incorporated the brands Gizmodo AU, Business Insider Australia, Kotaku and POPSUGAR Australia.

Coverage
A Gizmodo blogger captured the first photos from the floor of the International Consumer Electronics Show (CES) 2007 and, according to Reuters, journalists at the (simultaneous) Macworld debated whether Gizmodo or Engadget had the better live coverage of Steve Jobs' 2007 keynote speech.

Controversy

TV-B-Gone
Richard Blakeley, a videographer for Gizmodos publisher, Gawker Media, disrupted several presentations held at CES in 2008. Blakely secretly turned off TVs using TV-B-Gone remote controls, resulting in his being barred from CES 2008, and any future CES events.

iPhone 4 prototype
In April 2010, Gizmodo came into possession of what was later known to be a prototype of the iPhone 4 smartphone by Apple. The site purchased the device for US$5,000 from Brian J. Hogan, who had found it unattended at a bar in Redwood City, California, a month earlier. UC Berkeley student Sage Robert, an acquaintance of Hogan, allegedly helped him sell the phone after failing to track down the owner. With Apple confirming its provenance, bloggers such as John Gruber and Ken Sweet speculated that this transaction may have violated the California Penal Code.

On April 26, after Gizmodo returned the iPhone to Apple, upon Apple's request California's Rapid Enforcement Allied Computer Team executed a search warrant on editor Jason Chen's home and seized computers, hard drives, servers, cameras, notes, and a file of business cards, under direction from San Mateo County’s Chief Deputy District Attorney Stephen Wagstaffe. Since then, Gizmodo and the prosecution have agreed that a special master will review the contents of the items seized and determine if they contain relevant information. Gizmodo was since barred from Apple-hosted events and product launches until August 2014, when they were invited once again to Apple's September 2014 "Wish we could say more" event.

See also
 Lifehacker
 Techcrunch
 Wired

References

External links

 

American science websites
Gawker Media
Internet properties established in 2002
2002 establishments in the United States
Former Univision Communications subsidiaries